This is a list of films released by Anchor Bay Entertainment on home video, DVD, and Blu-ray. Formed as the result of a split between Video Treasures and Starmaker Entertainment in 1995, Anchor Bay began releasing films on VHS and DVD in 1997, and has since built a catalog of over 300 releases.

In the late 1990s and early 2000s, Anchor Bay specialized in distributing cult horror films and "B-movies", including an array of both popular and classic horror titles (e.g., Halloween, Prom Night) and more obscure and international titles from the 1960s, '70s, and '80s. The company also released a multitude of Hammer Studios films, giallo thrillers and Italian horror titles, particularly the films of Dario Argento and Lucio Fulci.

As Anchor Bay's business grew into the mid-2000s, it began to incorporate more non-horror films into its catalogue of releases.  The company was purchased by IDT Entertainment in 2003, and continued to release films under both their home media branch, as well as Anchor Bay Films, the company's own film studio, which mainly distributed independent films to small markets, until Starz was acquired by Lionsgate in 2016.

Home media

Feature films
Note: Films are listed according to their DVD release date. The release date of a VHS version, if any, varies and is listed in the second column when applicable.

Television

List adapted from The Internet DVD Database and Amazon.com.

References

Anchor Bay
Anchor Bay Entertainment List
Starz Entertainment Group